Sure Fire (or SureFire, Surefire) may refer to:

 Sure Fire, a lost 1921 John Ford film
 SureFire, an American manufacturer of flashlights and associated military equipment
 Surefire (song), on the 2016 John Legend album Darkness and Light
 Surefire: The Best of Econoline Crush, a 2010 compilation album
 Sure Fire (G.I. Joe), in the G.I. Joe action figures line

See also